Bartosz Kowalczyk (born 18 December 1996) is a Polish handball player for KS Azoty-Puławy and the Polish national team.

References

1996 births
Living people
People from Sokółka County
Sportspeople from Podlaskie Voivodeship
Polish male handball players